Sandi Lovrić (born 28 March 1998) is a professional footballer who plays as a midfielder for Serie A club Udinese and the Slovenia national team. After playing for Austria at all youth levels, he decided to represent Slovenia at senior level.

Club career

Lovrić joined Sturm Graz in 2012 from SV Rapid Lienz. He made his league debut on 17 August 2014 in a 1–1 home draw against Austria Wien by coming on as a substitute for Marko Stanković. On 9 May 2018, he won the Austrian Cup with Sturm after defeating Red Bull Salzburg 1–0 in the final.

On 3 July 2019, Lovrić signed a three-year deal with Swiss side Lugano after he decided to not extend his contract with Sturm Graz.

On 28 March 2022, he signed a five-year contract with Serie A side Udinese.

International career
Eligible to represent Austria, Croatia, Bosnia and Herzegovina and Slovenia internationally, Lovrić has represented Austria at all youth selections from under-16 to under-21, making over 50 appearances between 2013 and 2019. He stated that he was never approached by anyone from the Croatian Football Federation.

In September 2020, he decided to represent Slovenia at senior level after being approached by their coach Matjaž Kek. He debuted for Slovenia on 7 October 2020 in a friendly game against San Marino, playing for 59 minutes before being substituted by Benjamin Verbič.

On 14 October 2020, Lovrić scored his first goal in a 4–0 UEFA Nations League victory over Moldova. On 24 March 2021, he scored his second goal, the only goal in the 1–0 World Cup qualifying victory over his fatherland Croatia. The upset victory was notably Slovenia's first victory over Croatia in history.

Personal life
Lovrić's parents are of Croatian descent. His father hails from Slavonski Brod and his mother is a Bosnian Croat from Modriča. They moved to Piran, Slovenia as migrant workers, and later to Austria, where Lovrić was born. Alongside German, Lovrić also fluently speaks Croatian and Italian.

As a youngster, Lovrić often spent summer vacations in Slovenia, and cited his connection to the country as the main reason to represent the Slovenia national team.

Lovrić named Luka Modrić as his football idol.

Career statistics

Club

International

Scores and results list Slovenia's goal tally first, score column indicates score after each Lovrić goal.

Honours
Sturm Graz
Austrian Cup: 2017–18

Lugano
Swiss Cup: 2021–22

References

External links
Sandi Lovrić at Eurosport

1998 births
Living people
People from Lienz
Footballers from Tyrol (state)
Slovenian footballers
Slovenia international footballers
Austrian footballers
Austria youth international footballers
Austria under-21 international footballers
Association football midfielders
Austrian expatriate footballers
Slovenian expatriate footballers
SK Sturm Graz players
FC Lugano players
Udinese Calcio players
Austrian Football Bundesliga players
Swiss Super League players
Serie A players
Austrian expatriate sportspeople in Switzerland
Slovenian expatriate sportspeople in Switzerland
Expatriate footballers in Switzerland
Austrian expatriate sportspeople in Italy
Slovenian expatriate sportspeople in Italy
Expatriate footballers in Italy
Austrian people of Croatian descent
Slovenian people of Croatian descent
Austrian people of Bosnia and Herzegovina descent
Slovenian people of Bosnia and Herzegovina descent